Liang Peixing (born December 8, 1991 in Guangdong) is a Chinese sprint canoer who competed in the late 2000s. She finished ninth in the K-4 500 m event at the 2008 Summer Olympics in Beijing.

References

Sports-Reference.com - Liang Peixing's profile

1991 births
Living people
People from Shantou
Sportspeople from Guangdong
Olympic canoeists of China
Canoeists at the 2008 Summer Olympics
Chinese female canoeists